Shaun Pickering (born 14 November 1961) is a retired Welsh shot putter.  Pickering won a bronze medal at the 1998 Commonwealth Games representing Wales and finished 27th at the 1996 Olympics.  Pickering is a member of the Welsh Athletics hall of fame for a career that included winning 5 Welsh shot put titles, 5 Welsh discus throw titles, and 9 Welsh hammer throw titles.  Pickering is the son of Olympian Jean Pickering and Ron Pickering and in 2010 became the heavy throws coach for UK Athletics.

References

External links

1961 births
Living people
British male shot putters
British male discus throwers
Athletes (track and field) at the 1986 Commonwealth Games
Athletes (track and field) at the 1998 Commonwealth Games
Athletes (track and field) at the 1996 Summer Olympics
Olympic athletes of Great Britain
Commonwealth Games bronze medallists for Wales
Commonwealth Games medallists in athletics
Medallists at the 1998 Commonwealth Games